Haruna Kawashima (born 12 April 1993) is a Japanese professional footballer who plays as a midfielder for WE League club Sanfrecce Hiroshima Regina.

Club career 
Kawashima made her WE League debut on 12 September 2021.

References 

Living people
1993 births
Japanese women's footballers
Women's association football midfielders
Association football people from Shizuoka Prefecture
Sanfrecce Hiroshima Regina players
WE League players